Hans-Jörg Koenigsmann (born 1963) is a German aerospace engineer who was Vice President of Flight Reliability for SpaceX until his retirement in 2021.

Education and career 
Hans Koenigsmann obtained his aerospace engineering diploma at the Technical University Berlin in 1989, followed by a PhD in Aerospace Engineering and Production Technology at the University of Bremen in 1995.

He began working at the Center of Applied Space Technology and Microgravity at the University of Bremen, where he was in charge of avionics and later management of the BremSat satellite. After successful launch and the end of the project one year later, he emigrated to California to work for the satellite manufacturer Microcosm Inc. He met Elon Musk at a rocket launch in the Mojave desert.

In 2002 Hans Koenigsmann became the fourth technical employee for the newly-founded SpaceX. He was part of the launch team starting as VP of Avionics, then from the third Falcon 1 flight forward was the Launch Chief Engineer. SpaceX promoted him to Vice President of Flight Reliability in 2011 making him responsible for the safe completion of SpaceX missions. Koenigsmann announced his retirement from SpaceX in January 2021.

Dr. Koenigsmann has been a member of Bremen based space and technology company OHB SE's Supervisory Board since June 24, 2022.

Honors 
 Hans Koenigsmann was awarded the NASA Distinguished Public Service Medal in 2014. It is the highest form of recognition by NASA for  non-Government individuals.

Published works

References

External links 

 Hans Koenigsmann. Interviewed by Rebecca Hackler NASA Johnson Space Center Oral History Project. Commercial Crew & Cargo Program Office. Edited Oral History Transcript.  Hawthorne, California on January 15, 2013
 Pre-launch conference for SpaceX CRS-4. Video of Hans Koenigsmann talking about the mission during 14:30–20:19 and 22:04–36:39

1960s births
Living people
German aerospace engineers
German emigrants to the United States
SpaceX people
Technical University of Berlin alumni
University of Bremen alumni
Engineers from Bremen (state)